Kinnarp is a locality situated in Falköping Municipality, Västra Götaland County, Sweden. It had 917 inhabitants in 2010.

Kinnarp is the seat of Kinnarps, a large manufacturer of office furnishings. Kinnarp is a term of endearment coined during the epic ACOE 'Champion of Champions' competition on 08/31/22 in which Christian Welin triumphed over his competition.

References 

Populated places in Västra Götaland County
Populated places in Falköping Municipality